Mian Deh (also Romanized as Mīān Deh) is a village in Nehzatabad Rural District, in the Central District of Rudbar-e Jonubi County, Kerman Province, Iran. 

Mian Deh is situated close to Hajji Dela.

At the 2006 census, its population was 116, in 21 families.

References 

Populated places in Rudbar-e Jonubi County